Parliamentary elections were held in Uzbekistan on 25 December 1994, with a second round held in 39 constituencies on 8 January 1995 and seven constituencies on 22 January. The election was contested by 634 candidates, 250 nominated by local councils, 243 members of the People's Democratic Party of Uzbekistan, and 141 Progress Party of the Fatherland members. The majority of seats were won by local council nominees (around 120 of which were PDP members), whilst the People's Democratic Party emerged as the largest party.

Voter turnout was 94% in the first round.

Results

References

Uzbeikistan
1994 in Uzbekistan
Uzbekistan
1995 in Uzbekistan
Elections in Uzbekistan
Election and referendum articles with incomplete results